Tritan may refer to:

 Tritan Shehu (born 1954), Albanian politician
 A tradename for tritan copolyester owned by Eastman Chemical Company
 A fictional robot in the Tobot animated series
 A type of blue-yellow color blindness, comprising tritanomaly and tritanopia

See also 
 Tristan (disambiguation)
 Triton (disambiguation)